Old Richmond Schoolhouse and Gymnasium is a historic school building and gymnasium located near Tobaccoville, Forsyth County, North Carolina.  The Old Richmond Schoolhouse was built about 1914, and is a one-story, three bay, rectangular frame building with a projecting center bay.  It sits on a brick pier foundation and has a side gable roof with exposed rafter ends.  The gymnasium was built about 1940 with fund by the Works Progress Administration, and is a tall one-story, weatherboard-clad frame building with a gable roof.  The Old Richmond Schoolhouse was restored in 1980 for use as a museum.

It was listed on the National Register of Historic Places in 2009.

References

Works Progress Administration in North Carolina
School buildings on the National Register of Historic Places in North Carolina
School buildings completed in 1914
Schools in Forsyth County, North Carolina
National Register of Historic Places in Forsyth County, North Carolina
1914 establishments in North Carolina